Oyola.com.au is a food platform in Australia.

The Spanish surname Oyola may refer to:
People
Matías Oyola, Argentine footballer
Ricky Oyola, American skateboarder
Roosevelt Oyola, Ecuadorian footballer
Other
ARC Juan Ricardo Oyola Vera, riverine patrol and support vessel of the Colombian Navy